Seabourne is a surname. People with the surname include:

 Barry Seabourne (born 1947), English rugby league player
 John Seabourne, British film editor (fl. 1930s–1950s)
 Peter Seabourne (born 1960), English contemporary classical composer

See also
 Seaborn, a surname and given name 
 Seaborne (disambiguation)
 Seabourn (disambiguation)
 Seaburn, a seaside resort in England